The 1977 Tangerine Bowl was an American college football bowl game played on December 23, 1977 at Orlando Stadium in Orlando, Florida. The game pitted the Florida State Seminoles and the Texas Tech Red Raiders.

Background
Texas Tech started the season ranked #8 in the nation, winning their first two games of the season before a face-off with #6 Texas A&M, which they lost 33–17. Three straight wins got them to #14, but a 26–0 loss to #1 Texas dropped them out permanently. Wins over TCU and SMU followed, but they lost to Houston and #6 Arkansas to finish the season. They finished tied for fourth in the Southwest Conference. This was their sixth bowl game of the decade. Florida State had just two losses, compounded with a six-game winning streak. They reached #13 at one point (before a loss to San Diego State), but they finished the season strong with a 37–9 thrashing of Florida. This was their first bowl game since 1971.

Game summary
Florida State – Dave Cappelen 23 yard field goal, 5:50 remaining
Texas Tech – Mike Mock 24 yard field goal, 10:24 remaining
Florida State – Larry Key 93 yard kickoff return touchdown (Cappelen kick), 9:37 remaining
Florida State – Roger Overby 37 yard touchdown pass from Jimmy Jordan (Cappelen kick failed), 3:55 remaining
Florida State – Mike Shumann 40 yard touchdown pass from Jordan (King pass from Jordan), 12:30 remaining
Florida State – Cappelen 22 yard field goal, 9:13 remaining
Texas Tech – Nelson 44 yard touchdown pass from Rodney Allison (Allison pass failed), 7:46 remaining
Florida State – Overby 15 yard touchdown pass from Jordan (Cappelen kick), 3:39 remaining
Texas Tech – Billy Taylor 21 yard touchdown run (Taylor pass from Allison), 2:01 remaining
Florida State – Chip Sanders 44 yard touchdown pass from Wally Woodham (Cappelen kick), :48 remaining

Jimmy Jordan threw 18-of-25 for 311 yards and three touchdowns en route to an MVP effort. Florida State had 22 first downs to Texas Tech's 21 first downs. Tech had 99 rushing yards (on 44 carries) while the Seminoles had 85 (on 37 carries). Florida State threw for 455 passing yards while the Red Raiders threw for 379. The Seminoles had two turnovers, but the Red Raiders turned it over four times. While Florida State had 10 penalties for 130 yards, they managed to convert their opportunities into points, where as Tech did not do as such, at least until the second half where it was too late.

Statistics

Aftermath
The Red Raiders did not qualify for another bowl game until the 1986 Independence Bowl. Florida State's next bowl appearance was the 1980 Orange Bowl.

References

Tangerine Bowl
Citrus Bowl (game)
Florida State Seminoles football bowl games
Texas Tech Red Raiders football bowl games
Tangerine Bowl
Tangerine Bowl